Marshall Otis Howe (October 4, 1832 – May 13, 1919) was a farmer, school superintendent and Justice of the Peace from Newfane, Vermont and member of the Vermont House of Representatives, serving in 1882.

Personal background and family relations
Marshall Otis Howe was born in Wardsboro, Vermont to Otis Howe (1793–1872) and Sally (Marsh) Howe (1796–1877).  He was married on 15 August 1866 to Gertrude Isabel Dexter, and was a farmer in Newfane, Vermont and served as a school superintendent and Justice of the Peace.  In 1882 he was elected to a one-year term in the Vermont House of Representatives.  Howe died at his home in Newfane on 13 May 1919. Howe was a direct descendant of John Howe (1602-1680) who arrived in Massachusetts Bay Colony in 1630 from Brinklow, Warwickshire, England and settled in Sudbury, Massachusetts. Marshall Otis Howe was also a descendant of Edmund Rice, an early immigrant to Massachusetts Bay Colony, as follows:

 Marshall Otis Howe, son of
 Otis Howe (1793-1872), son of
 Gardner Howe (1759-1854), son of
 Priscilla Rice (1731-?), daughter of
 Luke Rice (1689-1754), son of
 Daniel Rice (1655-1737), son of
 Edward Rice (1622-1712), son of
 Edmund Rice, (ca1594-1663)

References 

1832 births
1919 deaths
People from Wardsboro, Vermont
Members of the Vermont House of Representatives
19th-century American politicians